David Downie Gray (13 April 1923 – 1985) was a Scottish professional footballer who played as a right half.

Career
Born in Clydebank, Gray moved from Queensbury United to Bradford City in September 1948. He scored 13 goals in 242 Football League appearances for Bradford City, as well as making a further 15 FA Cup appearances. He left Bradford City in October 1957 to sign for Ossett Town, and also played for Halifax Town.

Sources

References

1923 births
1985 deaths
Association football wing halves
Bradford City A.F.C. players
English Football League players
Halifax Town A.F.C. players
Ossett Town F.C. players
Sportspeople from Clydebank
Footballers from West Dunbartonshire
Scottish footballers